Rubus hispidus, with the common names swamp dewberry, bristly dewberry, bristly groundberry, groundberry, hispid swamp blackberry or running swamp blackberry, is North American species of dewberry in the rose family.

The plant grows in moist or sometimes dry soils, ditches, swales or open woods in central and eastern North America, from Ontario and Minnesota east to Newfoundland, and south to South Carolina and Mississippi.

Description
Rubus hispidus is a small, herb-like shrub up to 20 cm (8 inches) tall.  The twigs are red and have bristles. Flowers are generally in small clumps, each with five white rounded petals. The fruit are dark purple, almost black.

Uses
The plant is eaten by birds and many mammals.

A dull blue dye can be created from its berries. The fruit also can be used as an astringent.

The berries are rather bitter for culinary use, and so this plant is generally not cultivated.

References

External links
 

Rubus
Flora of North America
Plants described in 1753